Pompe may refer to:

People
Annelie Pompe (born 1980), adventurer and athlete from Sweden
J. L. C. Pompe van Meerdervoort (1829–1908), Dutch physician based in Japan
Johann Pompe (1901–1945), Dutch pathologist
Kurt Pompe (1899–1964), German Nazi SS concentration camp commandant

Other
Calliotropis pompe, a species of sea snail, a marine gastropod mollusk in the family Calliotropidae
Glycogen storage disease type II, also called Pompe disease
Rue de la Pompe, a street in Paris, France, which was named after the pump which served water to the castle of Muette
Rue de la Pompe (Paris Métro), a station on line 9 of the Paris Métro, named after the Rue de la Pompe